USC&GS Fathomer was the name of two United States Coast and Geodetic Survey ships, and may refer to:

 , previously USCS Fathomer, a survey ship in service in the United States Coast Survey from 1871 to 1878 and in the U.S. Coast and Geodetic Survey from 1878 to 1881
 , a survey ship in service from 1905 to 1942

Fathomer